Line 2 of the Guiyang Metro is a rapid transit line in Guiyang, Guizhou, China.

History
Construction began in September 2015. The line opened on 28 April 2021.

Opening timeline

Stations

References

02
2021 establishments in China
Railway lines opened in 2021
Airport rail links in China